Narayan Das may refer to:

 Narayan Das (footballer) (born 1993), Indian footballer
 Narayan Das (Bihar politician), Indian politician
 Narayan Das (Jharkhand politician), Indian politician